Ponta Preta is a headland in the northwest of the island of Santiago, Cape Verde. It is about 3 km northwest of the town of Tarrafal, and marks the northwestern limit of Baía de Tarrafal (Tarrafal Bay). There is a lighthouse on the headland, Farol da Ponta Preta.

References

Geography of Santiago, Cape Verde
Preta